Jayammu Nischayammu Raa is a  2016 Telugu film starring Srinivasa Reddy, Poorna, Posani Krishna Murali, Sree Vishnu, Krishnudu, Ravi Varma, Krishna Bhagavaan, Praveen and Thagubothu Ramesh in pivotal roles, directed and produced by Shiva Raj Kanumuri under his banner Shiva Raj Films as the first film with an ensemble cast and crew. The film was inspired from the 1976 Hindi movie Chhoti Si Baat which itself was loosely based on the 1960 British movie School for Scoundrels.

Plot
In 2013, in Andhra Pradesh, Mangallam Sarvesh Kumar aka Sarvam (Srinivas Reddy) from Karimnagar has been preparing for state PSC exams for the past 10 years. Sarvam is shy & naive and believes strongly in astrology and follows Pitha (Jeeva), a famous astrologer. He is finally called for an interview in Hyderabad. On the way to attending the interview, he sees a woman in the market and falls in love.

He calls Pitha, who tells him that the woman he had seen in the marketplace is a lucky charm for him and may be the reason he got the job. He is posted to Kakinada Municipal office, and he stays at one of his old friend's home as a caretaker. He wishes to get transferred to his hometown, to care of his old widowed mother. The transfer lies with the commissioner JC (Ravi varma), who is a womanizer. JC promises to transfer Sarvam on a condition to use Sarvam's house as a private space to carry out his sexual affairs.

Sarvam finds that the woman he saw is Rani (Poorna), a temporary worker in a eSeva office adjacent to his office. He gets her date of birth certificate for matching his horoscope with hers.  After matching horoscopes perfectly, he decides to woo her for his well fortune.
Rani is a middle-class woman who does not believe in astrology. She also dislikes her job and wants to own a nursery. She applies for a government land for nursery in the municipal office. Sarvam was given her file and he befriends her.

After a while, Sarvam decides to propose to her at her favourite restaurant. Rani stands him up; she is in love with JC, who has also proposed to her and she accepts. After a surprise party for Rani on her birthday, Sarvam finds out her actual date of birth and sends the rectified details to Pitha who instructs to leave Rani because the horoscopes didn't match and she will a bad luck to him. Feared Sarvam tries to maintain distance from her.

JC calls Sarvam to his cabin and instructs him to loan out his house for the night. JC brings Rani to Sarvam's house on the pretext of a birthday gift. Rani, taken aback by the sexual advances of JC tries to escape. Meanwhile Sarvam, who was struggling with his consciousness, decides to help her and unlocks the door and Rani escapes. After that Sarvam realise that he has good thinking and courage to do good but he lacks self-confidence and self-belief. He becomes confident, stops believing in astrology and decides to face the world with his newfound perspective.

JC being upset with her puts hold on Rani's files. However Sarvam successfully gets them approved through the collector's office. Rani is allotted a plot for nursery. She starts preparation for her nursery works. Her brother arranges a match to her which fulfills her requirements but she realises she loves Sarvam and decides to propose to him on the opening of her nursery.

Through Tathkal (Praveen), Rani knows about Sarvam's beliefs in horoscope and letting JC use his house. She then avoids Sarvam and agrees to her family's match. At the wedding, Rani realizes the whole truth about Sarvam, regrets misunderstanding him and now wants to marry him. With the help of the priest, they get married.
Finally, Sarvam gets transferred to Karimnagar and they plan that Rani's nursery also to be shifted.

Cast

 Srinivasa Reddy as Mangalam Survesh Kumar aka Sarvamangalam "Sarvam"
 Poorna as Rani
 Krishnudu as Rani's brother
 Sree Vishnu as Kantha Rao
 Posani Krishna Murali as Guntur Panthulu
 Ravi Varma as JC, Sarvam's boss
 Krishna Bhagavaan as Adapa Prasad
 Praveen as Tatkal
 Dubbing Janaki as Sarvam's mother Andalamma
 Krishnam Raju (Jogi Raju)
 Jogi Naidu
 Jeeva as Pitha Baba
 Rahul Ramakrishna as Yadagiri
 Meena
 Thagubothu Ramesh as Sachin
 Raghu Karumanchi as Bolt
 Prabhas Sreenu as Seenanna
 Rajendra Pinnamaraju
 Sunny
 Siri
 Mirchi Hemanth as Ranjit

Production
The movie had various shooting schedules which were shot at places in cities like Hyderabad, Vizag, Yanam and Kakinada. The movie's first look was launched on 15 February 2016, by director Trivikram and actor Nithiin.

Soundtrack

Music was composed by Ravi Chandra, and released on Aditya Music company.

References

External links
 

2016 films
2010s Telugu-language films
Indian romantic comedy films
2016 romantic comedy films
Workplace comedies
Films set in 2013
Films shot in Telangana
Films shot in Andhra Pradesh
Films set in Andhra Pradesh
Films about astrology